Audrey Moore is an American actress. She is best known for her role in the Netflix series Godless. She is also known for her roles in Better Call Saul and Manhattan.

Filmography

Film

Television

References

External links 
 

Living people
American film actresses
American television actresses
21st-century American actresses
Year of birth missing (living people)